Highland Lakes may refer to a place in the United States:

 Highland Lakes, Alabama, in the Birmingham metropolitan area
 Highland Lakes, Florida
 Highland Lakes, New Jersey
 Texas Highland Lakes
 Highland Lakes Campus, Oakland Community College, Michigan

See also
 Highland Lake (disambiguation)